Pratochloa is a monotypic genus of flowering plants belonging to the family Poaceae. The only species is Pratochloa walteri.

Its native range is Namibia.

References

Poaceae
Monotypic Poaceae genera